Will Wright (born 12 June 1997) is an English professional footballer who plays for Gillingham, as a defender.

Career
Born in Luton, Wright played youth football for Luton Town, before playing in non-league football for Biggleswade United and Hitchin Town. He spent time on loan at Bedford Town and Barton Rovers, and went on trial with Norwich City.

He then signed for Colchester United where he failed to make an appearance, before moving to Dagenham & Redbridge, initially on loan. He was made club captain in his final season with the club, and made just under 150 appearances in his four seasons at Victoria Road.

He moved to League Two side Gillingham on a free transfer in June 2022. He made his debut for the Kent side in a 2–0 away loss to AFC Wimbledon on 30 July 2022.

Style of play
Wright can play at either right-back or centre-back. He describes himself as possessing a "good range of passing" and "hardworking, composed, I like to think I'm a leader and I like to take care of the ball in possession". He regularly takes on set-ball duties and has become known for his ability to score from free kicks and to deliver dangerous crosses.

References

1997 births
Living people
English footballers
Luton Town F.C. players
Biggleswade United F.C. players
Hitchin Town F.C. players
Bedford Town F.C. players
Barton Rovers F.C. players
Colchester United F.C. players
Dagenham & Redbridge F.C. players
Gillingham F.C. players
Association football defenders
National League (English football) players
English Football League players